Bernardo Bandini Baroncelli (15 January 1420 – 29 December 1479) was an Italian merchant and one of the instigators of the Pazzi conspiracy, a plot to remove the Medici family from power in Florence.

On Easter Sunday, 26 April 1478, there was an attempt to assassinate Lorenzo de' Medici and his brother Giuliano inside the Santa Maria del Fiore cathedral during High Mass. Giuliano was stabbed to death by Baroncelli and Franceso de' Pazzi, but Lorenzo was only wounded by the other conspirators and managed to escape. After the failure of the plot, Baroncelli fled Italy, but was eventually found and arrested in Constantinople. Antonio Medici was sent to bring him from Constantinople back to Florence, where Baroncelli was ultimately hanged on 29 December 1479 at the Palazzo del Bargello.

Baroncelli's excution was depicted in a macabre sketch drawn by Leonardo da Vinci while he was in Florence in 1479. With dispassionate integrity, Leonardo had registered the colours of the robes that Baroncelli was wearing at the time of his death in neat mirror writing.

In popular culture
Baroncelli appears as a tenor in Leoncavallo's 1893 opera I Medici He also appears as a minor antagonist in the 2009 video game Assassin's Creed II, in which he is depicted as a member of the Templar Order, who within the game's storyline are responsible for the Pazzi conspiracy. Rather than fleeing Italy after the failure of the plot, Baroncelli attempts to hide in San Gimignano, where he is eventually found and assassinated by Ezio Auditore.

References

External links

1420 births
1479 deaths
Italian people convicted of murder
People executed by Florence
People executed by hanging